Meng Daqiao (born September 1957) is a Chinese scientist specializing in nuclear materials and technology.

Education
Meng was born in Chunhua County, Shaanxi in September 1957. After the resumption of college entrance examination, he entered Sichuan University, majoring in the Department of Chemist.

Career
After graduating in 1980, he was assigned to the Ninth Design Institute of Machinery Industry as a technician and then assistant engineer. In December 1989 he joined the China Academy of Engineering Physics, where he successively worked as deputy director, director, and chief engineer.

Honours and awards
 1993 Science and Technology Progress Award (First Class)
 November 22, 2019 Member of the Chinese Academy of Sciences (CAS)

References

1957 births
Living people
People from Chunhua County
Scientists from Shaanxi
Sichuan University alumni
Members of the Chinese Academy of Sciences